Arthur L. Caplan (born 1950) is an American ethicist and professor of bioethics at New York University Grossman School of Medicine.

He is known for his contributions to the U.S. public policy, including: helping to found the National Marrow Donor Program; creating the policy of required request in cadaver organ donation adopted throughout the United States; helping to create the system for distributing organs in the U.S.; and advising on the content of the National Organ Transplant Act of 1984, rules governing living organ donation, and legislation and regulation in many other areas of health care including blood safety and compassionate use.

During the COVID-19 pandemic, he repeatedly stepped into controversy by universally criticizing those who were not fully vaccinated.

Early life and education
Born in Boston in 1950 to Sidney D. and Natalie Caplan, Arthur Caplan grew up in Framingham, Massachusetts. He has described his family as "Workmen's Circle, Zionist, and secular." He credits his background of Judaism with stimulating his interest in methods of inquiry and argument. At age six, Caplan was diagnosed with polio. He was successfully treated at Children's Hospital in Boston and went on to play sports at Framingham North High School. Caplan has stated that this life-threatening illness was a formative experience that influenced his later commitment to philosophy and bioethics.

Caplan did his undergraduate work at Brandeis University, where he majored in philosophy. There he met his future wife Jane. Their son, Zachary, was born in 1984. Caplan's second wife, Meg O’Shea Caplan, is the medical center director of the Bronx VA Medical Center.

Caplan did his graduate work at Columbia University, receiving an M.A. in 1973, an M.Phil. in 1975, and a Ph.D. in the history and philosophy of science in 1979. His dissertation, Philosophical Issues Concerning the Synthetic Theory of Evolution, was co-supervised by Ernest Nagel and Sidney Morgenbesser. Caplan worked with Nagel as a teaching assistant and was the final graduate student of Nagel's career. During his time at Columbia, Caplan met psychoanalyst and Dean of Education Bernard Schoenberg. Schoenberg allowed him to participate as both an observer and a medical student in clinical rotations in the university's medical college, first experiencing "ethics in action".

Career
In 1977, Caplan met Daniel Callahan, a philosopher who co-founded The Hastings Center (now in Garrison, New York) with psychiatrist Willard Gaylin. In 1977, Caplan joined The Hastings Center, first as a junior research assistant and then as a post-doctoral fellow. He spent the next 10 years at the center, serving as the associate director from 1985 to 1987. During this time, Caplan published many papers on genetics (including the ethics of genetic testing and screening), evolution, sociobiology, and the teaching of ethics. He also became involved in the ethics of human and animal experimentation and new medical technologies, applying philosophy in public discourse and speaking on public policy issues.

In 1987, Caplan moved to the University of Minnesota, where he became a professor in the Departments of Philosophy and Surgery and the first director of the Center for Biomedical Ethics. In 1989, he organized the Center for Bioethics Conference on Medical Ethics and the Holocaust, the first conference convened to discuss bioethics and the Holocaust. During his time at Minnesota he was active on issues relating to organ transplantation and genetics and worked with Rosalie A. Kane on dilemmas of "everyday ethics" involving treatment of the elderly. He also wrote about bioethics in relation to the Holocaust. In 1992, he joined the Medical Advisory Council of the United States Holocaust Memorial Museum.

Caplan secured the first apology for the Tuskegee Syphilis Study, from Lewis Sullivan, M.D., then secretary of HHS, in 1991. He worked with William Seidelman, M.D., and others to secure in 2012 an apology from the German Medical Association for the role of German physicians in Nazi prison experiments during the Holocaust.
 
In May 1994, Caplan went to the University of Pennsylvania in Philadelphia. He founded the Center for Bioethics and the Department of Medical Ethics and had professorial appointments in a variety of departments including Medicine and Philosophy. In the mid-1990s, he and colleagues conducted the first empirical studies on organ donor eligibility and donation rates. In 2009, the Sidney D. Caplan Professor of Bioethics was established at the University of Pennsylvania's Perelman School of Medicine, named for Caplan's father. Arthur Caplan became the first holder of the professorship.

While at the University of Pennsylvania, he became the first bioethicist to be sued for his professional role, after his involvement in a gene therapy trial that resulted in the death of research subject Jesse Gelsinger. The family’s suit was settled with the University for an undisclosed amount of money, in exchange for, among other things, dropping Caplan from the suit. The federal government’s suit on the same facts was settled for $500,000.

In 2009, Caplan helped develop the first flu vaccine mandate at the Children's Hospital of Philadelphia and, later, New York state's policy to require health care workers to "vaccinate or mask". Also in 2009, he called for tightening restrictions on fertility clinics and IVF and has written extensively in favor of embryonic stem cell research.

In 2012, Caplan came to New York University's School of Medicine as the Drs. William F. and Virginia Connolly Mitty Professor of Bioethics and the founding director of the Division of Bioethics.

In May 2015, Caplan launched, with pharmaceutical company Johnson & Johnson, a pilot project for the equitable distribution of experimental drugs outside ongoing clinical trials. He created the Compassionate Use Advisory Committee (CompAC), a panel of bioethicists, physicians, and patient advocates, to respond to appeals from terminally ill patients for a cancer drug in development by J&J. It is believed to be the first of its kind in the pharmaceuticals industry.

Recent activity has included spearheading a movement to relax restrictions on blood donations by gay men and urging postponement of the Rio Summer Olympics because of the Zika virus threat. In early May 2020, the United States Conference of Mayors announced the Mayors Advisory Panel on Sports, Recreation & Health, with Caplan as a co-chair, to "advise mayors and sports and recreation officials on safe policies and practices as cities reopen from the COVID-19 pandemic", and in November 2020 he joined the NCAA COVID-19 Medical Advisory Group. MarketWatch featured Caplan in an article on the life of a bioethicist during the COVID-19 pandemic on August 4, 2020.

Much of his time from 2020 to present has been focused on the COVID-19 pandemic. He has spoken and written extensively on vaccine-related topics, including the ethics of placebo-controlled trials during the pandemic, what is owed to vaccine trial participants after a vaccine has been authorized, COVID-19 vaccination of transplant candidates, and more specialized topics such understanding attitudes toward the disease and vaccines among a Haredi-Orthodox Jewish community. He was one of the more vocal proponents of controversial challenge studies for SARS-CoV2 vaccines.

Caplan has been criticized by some classical philosophers for his "hands-on philosophy", and by some colleagues for his enthusiastic engagement with the media. In response, he said: "To me, the whole point of doing ethics is to change people, to change behavior. Why else do it?"

In 2022, Caplan advocated that pharmaceutical companies should stop doing business in Russia, an action that was criticized as advocating for a war crime.

Academic work
Caplan is the author and editor of more than 35 books and more than 860 papers in peer-reviewed journals of medicine, science, philosophy, bioethics, and health policy.

He is a regular contributor to WebMD's Medscape and a regular commentator on CNN, WOR Radio, WGBH (FM)'s "Boston Public Radio" and WMNF Tampa's "Everyday Ethics" podcast. He is a frequent guest and commentator on various other media outlets, discussing public health issues like obesity, Ebola virus disease, Zika virus, vaccination, and COVID-19.

He has been co-director of the Joint Council of Europe/United Nations Study on Trafficking in Organs and Body Parts. He was the co-director of a United Nations/Council of Europe Study on organ trafficking. He has called for a new international convention on criminal organ trafficking. He has spoken out on international issues such as organ harvesting from Falun Gong practitioners in China. He instituted a boycott by leading medical journals of papers about transplantation coming from China.

Internationally, he was the chair of the Advisory Committee to the United Nations on Human Cloning, and served on the special advisory committee to the International Olympic Committee on genetics and gene therapy.

Caplan has served on a number of national committees, including as chair of the National Cancer Institute Biobanking Ethics Working Group and chair of the Advisory Committee to the Department of Health and Human Services on Blood Safety and Availability. He was a member of the Presidential Advisory Committee on Gulf War Illnesses and the special advisory panel to the National Institute of Mental Health on human experimentation on vulnerable subjects. He is an adviser to DARPA on synthetic biology and has addressed the Presidential Commission for the Study of Bioethical Issues. He has also served on the ethics committee of the American Society of Gene Therapy.

Caplan has consulted with many corporations, not-for-profit organizations, and consumer organizations. He is on the board of trustees of the Institute for Ethics and Emerging Technologies.
He also sat on the board of the National Center for Policy Research on Women & Families, the Franklin Institute, the Iron Disorders Foundation, and the National Disease Research Interchange.

Awards and honors
Caplan has been elected as a fellow of The Hastings Center (1990), the American Association for the Advancement of Science (1994), the College of Physicians of Philadelphia (1994), the New York Academy of Medicine (1997), and an honorary fellow of the American College of Legal Medicine (2008).

Caplan was named a person of the Year in 2001 by USA Today. In December 2008, Discover magazine named him one of the 10 most influential people in science, for ”translating philosophical debates into understandable ideas” and “democratizing bioethics.” He is one of the 10 most influential people in America in biotechnology, according to the National Journal; one of the 10 most influential people in the ethics of biotechnology, according to Nature Biotechnology; one of the 50 most influential people in American health care, according to Modern Health Care magazine; and one of the 100 most influential people in biotechnology, according to Scientific American magazine.

Caplan holds seven honorary degrees from colleges and medical schools. He received the McGovern Medal of the American Medical Writers Association in 1999, the John P. McGovern Award Lectureship from the Medical Library Association in 2007, and the Patricia Price Browne Prize in Biomedical Ethics in 2011.

In 2014, he was given the public service award of the National Science Board/National Science Foundation. In May 2016, he received the Rare Impact Award from the National Organization for Rare Disorders (NORD). The American Society for Bioethics & Humanities (ASBH) awarded Caplan its 2016 Lifetime Achievement Award, and in 2018 the Food and Drug Law Institute honored him with a Distinguished Service and Leadership Award. In December 2019, CompAC (the Compassionate Use Advisory Committees), which Caplan founded and chairs, received the Reagan-Udall Foundation for the FDA's Innovation Award.

Bibliography

 Caplan, Arthur L.; Redman, Barbara K (2018). Getting to Good: Research Integrity in Biomedical Sciences. Cham, Switzerland: Springer International.

References

External links

Bioethicists
Living people
Brandeis University alumni
Columbia Graduate School of Arts and Sciences alumni
Columbia University faculty
University of Minnesota faculty
University of Pittsburgh faculty
University of Pennsylvania faculty
New York University Grossman School of Medicine faculty
People from Boston
Hastings Center Fellows
1950 births
Framingham High School alumni